Caraglio is a comune (municipality) in the Province of Cuneo in the Italian region Piedmont, located about  southwest of Turin and about  northwest of Cuneo.

The municipality of Caraglio contains the frazioni (subdivisions, mainly villages and hamlets) Bottonasco, Cascina Bianca, Cascina Sottana, Grassini, Monturone, Oltre Grana, Palazzasso, Paschera San Carlo (Soprana), Paschera San Defendente (Sottana), Roata Bacias, Roata Borghi, Roata Bruno, Roata Chiabò, Roata Delfino, Roata Fresia, Roata Galliano, Roata Ghio, Roata Lorenzot, Roata Muschia, Rosata Armando, San Lorenzo, Tetto Bellino, Tetto Bianco, Tetto Boscasi.

Caraglio borders the following municipalities: Bernezzo, Busca, Cervasca, Cuneo, Dronero, Montemale di Cuneo, Valgrana.

Demographic evolution

Museums
 Silk Mill of Caraglio

Notable people
 Arnaldo Momigliano, historian, born in Caraglio

Twin towns — sister cities
Caraglio is twinned with:

  Laboulaye, Córdoba, Argentina

References